Ernest van den Haag (September 15, 1914 – March 21, 2002) was a Dutch-born American sociologist, social critic, and author. He was John M. Olin Professor of Jurisprudence and Public Policy at Fordham University. He was best known for his contributions to National Review.

Life and career
Ernest van den Haag was born in 1914 in the Hague to Moses "Max" Melamerson and Flora Haag Melamerson. He changed his surname in the early 1940s. While Van den Haag was still young, his family moved to Italy. Van den Haag grew up in Italy, and following his education began a life in politics. In the late 1930s, he was a left-wing activist and communist. During this time, Italy was ruled by Benito Mussolini's fascist regime. In 1937, Van den Haag was nearly murdered by a political assassin who shot him five times. After being shot, he spent nearly three years in prison. Nearly eighteen months of those three years were spent in solitary confinement. After release, fearing re-imprisonment, Van den Haag drifted between European countries in an attempt to evade Italy and Mussolini. In 1940, he made his way to Portugal and fled to the United States, arriving at Ellis Island, not knowing any English. Living in New York, Van den Haag worked as a bus boy and sold vegetables; eventually he was able to secure admission to the University at Iowa, where a group of faculty members recognized his intellectual gifts and agreed to pay for his tuition. In 1942, Van den Haag graduated with an M.A in economics. The same year, Van den Haag met the political philosopher Sidney Hook. His friendship with Hook forever changed Van den Haag, converting him from being a left-wing activist and communist, to the opposite end of the spectrum; Van den Haag was now a conservative. Over the years, Van den Haag took particular interest in the field of capital punishment and the death penalty. His book Punishing Criminals: Concerning a Very Old and Painful Question (1975) developed his reputation on being one of the foremost thinkers and proponents on the death penalty. Van den Haag was considered by his colleagues to be an expert on the issue of capital punishment.

Van den Haag died in Mendham, New Jersey.

On racial segregation in public schools
He was an early opponent of the social science behind the Supreme Court's decision in Brown v. Board of Education which found segregation in schools unconstitutional, and testified in favor of segregation. He also argued that continued school segregation was desirable because of the "genetic intellectual inferiority" of black students. In a National Review cover-page article, Van den Haag dismissed recent research undermining the notion of innate ethnic differences in intelligence, stating that he believed such differences existed and accounted for "much" of the poorer academic performance of black students, thus necessitating separate schooling. This article caused controversy among readers of the National Review, several of whom wrote angry letters against the decision to print such "bigotry." In 1966, he testified before the International Court of Justice in support of  apartheid in South Africa.

On race-neutrality in U.S. immigration policy
In another article, from 1965, he opposed the Immigration and Nationality Act of 1965, which replaced an immigration system largely excluding Asians and discriminating against southern and eastern Europeans with a race-neutral program based on skills and family connections to U.S. citizens and permanent residents, which enabled an increase in immigration from Asia. Van den Haag instead advocated greater rather than less immigration restriction.  He also expressly defended the practice of fashioning immigration policies in favor of European ethnicity, arguing that "The wish to preserve... the identity of one's nation requires no justification." He likened such a practice to a harmless expression of sentiment, similar to preferring to associate with one's own family rather than strangers. "The wish not to see one's country overrun by groups one regards as alien need not be based on feelings of superiority or 'racism.'"

On the death penalty
Van den Haag's particular field of interest, the field he contributed the most to in terms of publications, was the death penalty. Van den Haag was a respected debater, and when he was not contributing to the National Review or other publications, he was active in debating the issue of the death penalty. His main argument in its defense stemmed from key themes such as deterrence, and punishment for severe criminals.

Van den Haag's ideology is clearly conservative; in his book Punishing Criminals, he defines the primary role of government as "securing rights and duties by specifying them through laws and enforcing the laws." Van den Haag believed the paramount duty of government is to "provide legal order in which citizens can be secure in their lives, their liberties, and their pursuit of happiness." The law exists to provide legal order. Van den Haag disputed claims that capital punishment is just a form of legal retribution by claiming that if laws are knowingly broken, legal order can only be maintained by enforcement. Justice, Van den Haag claimed, is blindfolded, while retribution carries the weight of passion behind it; justice being delivered to someone who violates social order knowingly is equal, thus the term legal retribution is void.

Van den Haag also argued that people commit crimes because they believe, one way or another, they will benefit from committing the crime. Thus it is society's duty to make all crimes as disadvantageous as possible. Van den Haag uses economic examples to further prove his point. In economics, there is a concept named opportunity cost. Opportunity cost forces an individual to weigh the benefits versus the sacrifices of making a decision. Van den Haag believes people look at committing the crime the same way they would view an opportunity; they would weigh the profits versus the punishment. Temptation to commit a crime will be significantly decreased if the punishment for committing the crime is more severe.  The death penalty offers the greatest weighted punishment for committing an offense. Van den Haag also related Marxist theory behind his justification of the death penalty. Marxists, Van den Haag argued, believe that "Legal justice never can do less, though it can do more."  Legal justice should distribute punishment equally among violators and more frequently in order to deter crime.  Van den Haag also related to the Marxist belief in class warfare. Van den Haag states, "Obviously, the poor and powerless are more tempted to take what is not theirs, or to rebel, than the powerful and wealthy, who need not take what they already have."  The threat of severe punishment diminishes temptation, which Van den Haag argued is to be the greatest use of the death penalty, deterrence.

Van den Haag also believed that law breakers have more of an inclination to do it again. Breaking the law leads to a form of moral decay when eventually offenders no longer can distinguish right from wrong, thus repeat offending is a common occurrence. His response to this was, "The only permanent, and irrevocable incapacitation is execution."  Van den Haag believed that any temporary or permanent incapacitation only reduces the crime rate if there are no more compensating increases in crime by other people. However, if no strong deterrents such as the death penalty existed, an increase in crime and criminals will still be a factor.  Van den Haag believed homicide to be the most deplorable crime a human being can commit. Van den Haag, in his book The Death Penalty : A Debate, argues that "the state must teach that killing anyone deliberately, for whatever reason, is needless and wrong."

Van den Haag believed that capital punishment has a direct correlation with a decrease in murders. Rehabilitation as a response to murdering criminals is not an option because, as Van den Haag states, "no effective method to achieve it [Rehabilitation] has been found."  If a proper method of rehabilitation can be found, it would not reduce the crime rate, because rehabilitation only works after the crime has been committed. Deterrence is the only thing that can have any effect on the actual crime rate. Overall, Van den Haag directed his argument toward the fact that the death penalty ought only to exist to protect innocent lives. To sum up his entire argument against his opposition in one quote, Van den Haag contends, "I'd rather execute a man convicted of having murdered others than put the lives of innocents at risk. I find it hard to understand the opposite choice."  Van den Haag recognized that innocent people would sometimes be executed.

Literary works
Throughout his life, Ernest van den Haag wrote many books and articles about society, and more specifically about capital punishment.  His works include:
 The Death Penalty: A Debate, 1983 (co-authored with John P. Conrad)
 The Jewish Mystique, 1968
 Political violence and civil disobedience, 1972
 Punishing Criminals: Concerning a Very Old and Painful Question, 1975

References

External links
 The war in Katanga; the United Nations in the Congo, report of a mission. by Ernest van den Haag
 Ernest van den Haag, The Ultimate Punishment: A Defense.
 

1914 births
2002 deaths
American sociologists
Dutch emigrants to the United States
Fordham University faculty
Race and intelligence controversy
Writers from New York City
Member of the Mont Pelerin Society